The Embassy of Colombia in Washington, D.C. is the Republic of Colombia's diplomatic mission to the United States of America. The building is located at 1724 Massachusetts Avenue NW on Embassy Row.

See also
 Colombia–United States relations
 List of Washington, D.C. embassies

References

External links

 Embassy's Website 

Colombia
Colombia–United States relations
Washington, D.C.